Jeff Scholten (born November 6, 1977) is a Canadian short track speed skater who won bronze in the 5000m relay at the 1999 World Championships in Sofia. At the 2003 World Team Championships in Sofia, he won gold with the Canadian team.

Scholten had also several successes at the World Cup, including 3 personal and one team victories. The first podium was during the 1999-00 season when he finished second in the 3000m race in Gothenburg. At the next World Cup leg in Heerenveen, he won in 500m race.

External links
 Person Bio

1977 births
Living people
Canadian male short track speed skaters
World Short Track Speed Skating Championships medalists